Jonathan Livingston Seagull, written by American author Richard Bach and illustrated with black-and-white photographs shot by Russell Munson, is an allegorical fable in novella form about a seagull who is trying to learn about flying and, eventually, personal reflection, freedom, and self-realization. It was first published in book form in 1970 with little advertising or expectations; by the end of 1972, over a million copies were in print, the book having reached the number one spot on bestseller lists mostly through word of mouth recommendations.

In 2014 the book was reissued as Jonathan Livingston Seagull: The Complete Edition, which added a 17-page fourth part to the story.

Plot

Part One 
Jonathan Livingston Seagull, a seagull, is frustrated with the daily squabbles over meager food and sheer survival within his flock, without any deeper meaning behind life. Unlike his peers, he is seized with a passion for flight of all kinds, and his soul soars as he experiments with exhilarating challenges of daring aerial feats and learns more about the nature of his own body and the environment in achieving faster and faster flight. Eventually, his lack of conformity to the limited seagull life frightens the Flock, and they officially banish him with the label "Outcast". Not deterred by this, Jonathan continues his efforts to reach ever-greater flight goals, finding he is often successful. He lives a long happy life, and is sad not due to his loneliness but only due to the fact that the rest of the Flock will never know the full glories of flying, like him. In his old age, he is met by two radiantly-bright seagulls who share his abilities, explaining to him that he has learned much, but that they have come to take him "home" where he will go "higher".

Part Two 
Jonathan transcends into a reality, which he assumes is heaven, where all the gulls enjoy flying as much as he does, and they practice towards even more incredible maneuvers and speeds. He soon asks his instructor Sullivan why this community is so small. Sullivan says that Jon is unique in his willingness to learn; every gull chooses their next life through the choices made in their current life, a few progressing to this higher existence, but most others living through the same world over and over again. Jonathan approaches the Elder Gull of the community, Chiang, who admits that this reality is not heaven, but that heaven is the achieving of perfection itself: an ability beyond any particular time or place. Suddenly, Chiang disappears, then reappears a moment later, displaying his attainment of perfect speed. When Jon begs to learn Chiang's skills, Chiang explains that the secret to true flight is to recognize that one's nature exists across all time and space. After concentrating hard on this thought, Jon suddenly finds himself transported to a strange planet. Celebrating his beginner abilities, he continues practicing his teleportation talents with Chiang, gradually improving his understanding of the invisible principles of life and perfection. 

One day, Chiang slowly transforms into a blindingly luminous being and, just before disappearing for the last time, he gives Jon one last tip: "keep working on love". Jon ponders Chiang's words and, in a discussion with Sullivan, decides to return to his own home planet, to teach his original Flock all that he has learned. Arriving there, he finds a fellow lover of flying, Fletcher Lynd Seagull, who is angry at recently being "Outcast" by the Flock, to take on as his first new pupil. Jonathan says he will teach Fletcher only if Fletcher promises to forgive the Flock for banishing him.

Part Three 
Jonathan has now amassed a small group of Outcasts as flying students, with Fletcher the star pupil, and tells them that "each of us is in truth... an unlimited idea of freedom". The deeper nature of his words is not yet understood by his pupils, who believe they are just getting basic flying lessons. For a month, Jon boldly takes them to perform aerial stunts directly in front of the bewildered Flock. Some members of the Flock slowly join the Outcasts, and one new recruit with a broken wing is miraculously able to take to the air, simply with Jon's encouragement and a shift in mindset. Jon exclaims that freedom is the very nature of a gull's being, and any laws or fears against it should be cast aside. Meanwhile, Fletcher shares rumors that the rest of the Flock thinks Jonathan is either a messiah or a devil; Jon sighs at being misunderstood.

One day, Fletcher, flying too fast, is killed in a collision. Awaking in another reality, he hears Jon's voice teasing him that the trick to transcending the limitations of time and space is to take it step by step — not so quickly. With the decision to either persist in the afterlife or return to his world, Fletcher chooses the latter. He is resurrected in the very midst of the flabbergasted Flock, some of whom fear and decry his supernatural reappearance. Jon whisks Fletcher to safety, complaining about how difficult it is to convince birds that they are free and that they could prove it themselves if they just practiced, like he did. Fletcher asks Jon about his insistence in believing they should "love" the ignorant Flock. Jon replies that he means they should practice to "love the good in every one of them, and to help them see it in themselves". Jon also reveals that Fletcher is ready to become a teacher himself. Jon's body suddenly begins to fade away, he requests that Fletcher stop others from thinking of him as anything silly like a god, and he gives a final piece of advice: "find out what you already know".

On his own, Fletcher now faces a new group of eager students. He begins passing on Jon's sentiments that seagulls are limitless ideas of freedom, and their bodies nothing more than thought itself. Realizing this baffles the young gulls, he understands why Jon told him to slowly take teachings step by step, and he instead starts with a simpler lesson on flight. Privately musing on Jonathan's conviction that there are no limits, Fletcher smiles at the implication of this: that he will see Jonathan again, one day soon.

Part Four in 2014's re-print, Jonathan Livingston Seagull: The Complete Edition 
In 2013 Richard Bach took up a non-published fourth part of the book which he had written contemporaneously with the original. He edited and polished it, and then sent the result to a publisher. Bach reported that he was inspired to finish the fourth part of the novella by a near-death experience which had occurred in relation to a nearly fatal plane crash in August 2012. In February 2014, the 138-page Bach work Illusions II: The Adventures of a Reluctant Student was published as a booklet by Kindle Direct Publishing. Illusions II also contains allusions to and insights regarding the same near-death experience. In October 2014, Jonathan Livingston Seagull: The Complete Edition, was published, and this edition includes Part Four of the story.

Part Four focuses on the period several hundred years after Jonathan and his students have left the Flock and their teachings become venerated rather than practiced. The birds spend all their time extolling the virtues of Jonathan and his students and spend no time flying for flying's sake. The seagulls practice strange rituals and use demonstrations of their respect for Jonathan and his students as status symbols. Eventually some birds reject the ceremony and rituals and just start flying. Eventually one bird named Anthony Gull questions the value of living since "...life is pointless and since pointless is by definition meaningless then the only proper act is to dive into the ocean and drown. Better not to exist at all than to exist like a seaweed, without meaning or joy [...] He had to die sooner or later anyway, and he saw no reason to prolong the painful boredom of living." As Anthony makes a dive-bomb to the sea, at a speed and from an altitude which would kill him, a white blur flashes alongside him. Anthony catches up to the blur, which turns out to be a seagull, and asks what the bird was doing:

"I'm sorry if I startled you," the stranger said in a voice as clear and friendly as the wind. "I had you in sight all the time. Just playing...I wouldn't have hit you."

"No! No, that's not it." Anthony was awake and alive for the first time in his life, inspired. "What was that?"

"Oh, some fun-flying, I guess. A dive and pullup to a slow roll with a rolling loop off the top. Just messing around. If you really want to do it well it takes a bit of practice, but it's a nice-looking thing, don't you think?"

"It's, it's...beautiful, is what it is! But you haven't been around the Flock at all. Who are you, anyway?"

"You can call me Jon."

Development 
Bach initially wrote it as a series of short stories that were published in Flying magazine in the late 1960s.

Bach, who said the book came to him as "a visionesque spooky thing," stopped after he wrote 10 pages and didn't pick it up again for a few years.

The book was rejected by several publishers before coming to the attention of Eleanor Friede at Macmillan in 1969. "I think it has a chance of growing into a long-lasting standard book for readers of all ages," she wrote presciently in her acquisition memo. She convinced Macmillan to buy it and Bach received a $2,000 advance ($15,000 in 2022 dollars).

Jonathan Livingston Seagull is named after John H. Livingston, a Waco Aircraft Company test pilot who died of a heart attack in 1974, at the age of 76, just after he had test-flown an acrobatic home-built Pitts Special.

Reception 
The book was a sleeper hit; the first edition in 1970 was only 3,000 copies and it would take two years before reaching number one on the New York Times Bestseller List. "Not a single magazine or newspaper — including The New York Times Book Review — so much as mentioned" the book when it first came out, The Times reported in 1972. Macmillan failed to secure any advance publicity for Bach, but he personally took out two very small ads in The New York Times Book Review and Publishers Weekly. The first printing sold out by the end of 1970, and in 1971 an additional 140,000 copies were printed. Mostly a word of mouth phenomenon, it entered the NYT Bestseller List on April 20, 1972, where it remained for 37 weeks, and by July 1972 it had 440,000 copies in print. Reader's Digest published a condensed version. In 1972 and 1973, the book topped the Publishers Weekly list of bestselling novels in the United States.

Book sellers didn't know how to classify it. "Some put it under nature, some under religion, some under photography, some under children’s books." Friede's advice was "Put it next to the cash register."

Several early commentators, emphasizing the first part of the book, see it as part of the US self-help and positive thinking culture, epitomised by Norman Vincent Peale and by the New Thought movement. Film critic Roger Ebert wrote that the book was "so banal that it had to be sold to adults; kids would have seen through it."

The book is listed as one of fifty "timeless spiritual classics" in a book by Tom Butler-Bowdon, who noted that "it is easy now, thirty-five years on, to overlook the originality of the book's concept, and though some find it rather naïve, in fact it expresses timeless ideas about human potential."

John Clute, for The Encyclopedia of Fantasy (1997), wrote: "an animal fantasy about a philosophical gull who is profoundly affected by flying, but who demands too much of his community and is cast out by it. He becomes an extremely well-behaved accursed wanderer, then dies, and in posthumous fantasy sequences--though he is too wise really to question the fact of death, and too calmly confident to have doubts about his continuing upward mobility--he learns greater wisdom. Back on Earth, he continues to preach and heal and finally returns to heaven, where he belongs."

Bibliography, editions and translations 
Jonathan Livingston Seagull has been translated into over thirty languages. Here is a partial list of editions and translations:

In 1980 a Spanish edition was published by Pomaire (Barcelona) featuring illustrations by photographer Jordi Olavarrieta, translated by Carol and Frederick Howell. In 1981 a French edition was published by Flammarion (Paris) featuring illustrations by photographer Jordi Olavarrieta, translated by Pierre Clostermann.

In popular culture

Parodies 
 A 1972 parody, Marvin Stanley Pigeon, was published by Thomas Meehan in The New Yorker: "Marvin Stanley Pigeon was no ordinary pigeon. While other pigeons spent their time grubbing for food, Marvin Stanley Pigeon worked away on his book on the window ledge outside the Manuscript Room of the Public Library in Bryant Park. He wanted to get his novel done in time for Macmillan's spring list."
 Hubert Bermont wrote and published another parody, Jonathan Livingston Fliegle, with illustrations drawn by Harold Isen, in 1973. Its content contained many examples of Jewish humor.
 Another parody featuring Jewish humor, Jonathan Segal Chicken, was written by Sol Weinstein and Howard Albrecht. A self-proclaimed fable, it tells the story of a high-flying fabulous fowl who “dreamed of being more than soup.” It was published by Pinnacle Books in May 1973.
 Also in 1973, Price Stern Sloan published Ludwig von Wolfgang Vulture, a Satire, written by Dolph Sharp, a story about a vulture determined to push the limits on speed-reading.
 In 1998, a parody titled Jonathan Livingston Trafalgar Square Pigeon, written by David K. Lines, was published by Random House.

References 
 The book was mentioned frequently by Newfoundland businessman Geoff Stirling, who incorporated elements of the book into station graphics and overnight programming for his television channel CJON-DT.
 The children's arts charity The Flying Seagull Project is named after the novella.
 The book was featured in the 2018 second season of the Showtime series I'm Dying Up Here.
 The character is referenced in a 1997 episode of The Simpsons. In "The Mysterious Voyage of Homer," the Sea Captain exclaims, "Jonathan Livingston Seagull! We're on a collision course!"
 The character Mike Brady, in the 1995 parody The Brady Bunch Movie, is reading the book while in bed.
 In the 1980 film The Nude Bomb, Bill Dana plays a character named Jonathan Levinson Seigle.
 In Nina Simone's performance of "I Wish I Knew How It Would Feel to Be Free" at the 1976 Montreaux Jazz Festival, just after the mid-point, she sings, "Jonathan Livingston Seagull ain't got nothing on me!"
 The animated television series Puppy Dog Pals features, as a recurring character, a seagull named Jonathan.
 The digital multiplayer board game "100% Orange Juice" features seagulls from Flying Red Barrel as enemies. The seagull boss is called "Big the Jonathan."
 In Part of Your World: A Twisted Tale By Liz Braswell, Scuttle's Great-Grandgull Jona claims her Great-Grandfather gets confused sometimes and refers to her as "Jonathan. Jonathan Livingston."
 The book is referenced in the chapter "The Corsican Brothers" by the title character of Osamu Tezuka's Black Jack.
 The book is referenced in Key and Peele skit "Prepared for Terries," in which the events of the work are reconfigured as a loose allegory of the sketch's own questions of conformity in the face of personal discomfort.
 The book is referenced in Season 4, episode 5 of Showtime's Ray Donovan.
 The book is referenced in the movie The Chambermaid (Kino Lorber).
 The book is referenced in a Singapore drama, "Morning Express."

Music 
 Jonathan Livingston's passion for flying is illustrated in the song "Martı" (Seagull) by Turkish singer Yaşar Kurt.
 Jonathan Seagull is mentioned in the 1973 James Gang song "Ride the Wind" in the lyric "I wanna be like Jonathan Seagull, try to fly high on his wing."
 The novel inspired the Barclay James Harvest track, "Jonathan," written by Les Holroyd, from the band's 1975 album, Time Honoured Ghosts.
 ABBA member Björn Ulvaeus found his inspiration in Jonathan Seagull when writing the 1978 song "Eagle."
 "Jonathan's Dream," a song by Sid Sound, is inspired by the book. The song is featured on the dance simulation game Pump It Up Fiesta Ex.
 A song by Turkish singer Yasemin Mori, "Oyna" includes the lyric "Martı Jonathan" as a catchy phrase; the song is believed to draw inspiration from the book.
 The novel was one of the inspirations for the band name of A Flock of Seagulls.

Adaptations 
The novella inspired the production of a film of the same title in 1973. The film was made by Hall Bartlett many years before computer-generated effects were available. In order to make seagulls act on cue and perform aerobatics, Mark Smith of Escondido, California built radio-controlled gliders that looked like real seagulls from a few feet away. This footage was not used in the final cut of the film.

Bach had written the film's original screenplay, but he sued Paramount Pictures before the film's release because he felt that there were too many discrepancies between the film and the book. Director Bartlett had allegedly violated a term in his contract with Bach which stated that no changes could be made to the film's adaptation without Bach's consent. Bach took offense to scenes Bartlett had filmed which were not present in the book, most notably the sequence in which Jonathan is suddenly attacked by a wild hawk, which was voiced by Bartlett himself. Ultimately, the court ruled that Bach's name would be taken off the screenplay credits, and that the film would be released with a card indicating that Bach disapproved of the final cut. Bach's attorney claimed, "It took tremendous courage to say this motion picture had to come out of theaters unless it was changed. Paramount was stunned."

The Grammy Award-winning soundtrack album was composed and performed by Neil Diamond and produced by Tom Catalano. It won the 1974 Grammy Award as Best Original Score Written for a Motion Picture or a Television Special. The album apparently also made more money than the film, selling two million copies in the United States, 400,000 in France, 250,000 in Germany, 200,000 in Canada  and 100,000 in the United Kingdom.

The Irish actor Richard Harris won a Grammy in 1973 for the Audiobook LP Jonathan Livingston Seagull. To date, Harris's reading has not been released on any other format. Versions read by the author, Richard Bach, have been released on LP, cassette, and CD.

References 

1970 American novels
American novellas
American novels adapted into films
Books about birds
Books about spirituality
Fables
Fictional seabirds
Grammy Award for Best Spoken Word Album
Macmillan Publishers books
Self-help books
Works by Richard Bach